Ingrid Mathilda Kruse Malling (Jan 20, 1864 – Mar 21, 1942), known as Mathilda Malling, and even better known by her early pen name, Stella Kleve, was a Swedish novelist born January 20, 1864, on her family's farm, in North Mellby Parish, Kristianstad County, Sweden and died in København, Esajas sn, Sjælland, Copenhagen in 1942. Daughter of Danish estate owner, Frans Oskar Kruse, and Anna Maria Mathilda Borgström, she graduated from Lyceum for Girls in Stockholm, then studied at Lund University, in Switzerland, in 1884, and in Copenhagen, 1885-1886. In 1883 and was married in 1890 to merchant Peter Malling in Copenhagen.

Controversial early works
Malling debuted in 1885 with the novel Berta Funcke, followed in 1888 by the novel Alice Brandt, both published under the pseudonym Stella Kleve.
In 1886, she published the novel Pyrrhussegrar (Pyrrhic Victories) in the progressive feminist publication Framåt ('Forward') by Alma Åkermark.
Her contemporaries took note of her sensually colored depictions of young women, but posterity now considers her decadent late-naturalistic depiction of women as the female counterpart of the male breakthrough novels of this time. She had early contact with Ola Hansson who frequently corresponded with her and also courted and proposed to her. Hansen portrayed, after a difficult break-up with Malling, as a woman of the future. The young poets and the students Emil Kléen and Albert Sahlin wanted to do a small decadent publication (which never came out) in the late 1880s, but failed to persuade her. Anti-Semitism and misogyny in the decadence literary style have been the source of much scholarship.

Fictionalized Portrayal of Molly Brant
Detracting from presumed feminism, Malling's novel, Daybreak, published in 1906 by a respected "magazine of the world's best fiction," depicts entirely real characters and settings, by name, thus promoting the vilification of an early American feminist leader of native people. Today, the reader is impressed by its sensational, even slanderous, quality. The very real Mary Brant, and her culture, might well have considered such 'fictions' to be but a form of highly influential propaganda, presented with a thin veneer of fiction, and meant to degrade Brant, who was an influential Mohawk and the consort of Sir William Johnson.

A breakthrough female herself, perhaps insight into Malling's motivation, in scandalizing Brant through fiction, is somewhat explained in the University of Illinois's and Northwestern University's 1918 Scandinavian Studies and Notes: While "a popular writer of considerable talent... it is Mathilda Malling's pride to think that descendants of her own race did something to establish American freedom and they like so many others were resolved not to yield an inch from what they considered right."

Later works
After a long silence she resumed her writing, but in a very different character, with a novel about the First Consul, which was a huge success thanks to her skillful manipulation of historical material. Her work became hailed as well-done historically and even safe for family reading and included Madam Governor of Paris (1895, 2nd ed 1898), Eremitageidyllen (1896), Shooting on Munkeboda (1897), the play Lady Leonora (1897), Doña Ysabel (1898), Ladies in Markby (1901), Daybreak (1902), Nina (1903), Little Marica and Her Husband (1904), Lady Elizabeth Percy (1905), Her Hero (1906), Mary Stuart (1907), Nina's Honeymoon (1908), Karl Skytles Wife (1909), Sisters of Ribershus (1910) and The White House and Red House (1911). The later work shows lush, but little original, storytelling imagination and a lot of free floating. The historical novels found a large readership in the early 1900s, but her breakthrough novel Berta Funcke still arouses interest.

European recognition
Malling's first two novels were heatedly discussed. Swedish feminist Ellen Key was famously connected with her.

American recognition
Malling's first novel was cited by prominent American psychologist G. Stanley Hall, in his pioneering study of adolescence, as a parallel to the famously frank (and accusedly egotistic) authors Marie Bashkirtseff, Hilma Angered Strandberg, and Mary MacLane.

See also
 Sedlighetsdebatten

Bibliography
An Encyclopedia of Continental Women Writers, Volume 2, Katharina M. Wilson (1991)

References

Further reading

External links
 
 

1864 births
1942 deaths
19th-century Swedish writers
Swedish women novelists
20th-century Swedish writers
20th-century Swedish women writers
19th-century Swedish women writers